Crossfade is a Swedish rock-pop band; its core members are Lars Hallbäck, Richard Stenström and Göran Edman.
The music, according to allmusic   is being described as a blend of rock and pop.
As stated by The Midland Rocks, "Crossfade don’t succumb to the saminess or pale imitation syndromes that afflicts so many bands in this genre."
Adding to the Crossfade sound are well known musicians like singer Göran Edman, (known from Yngwie Malmsteen, Brazen Abbot), drummer Per Lindvall (ABBA, A-ha), bass player Sven Lindvall (A-ha, Kullrusk) and saxophone player Wojtek Goral (Stevie Wonder, Peter Getz) among others.

The first album "White on Blue" was being released in 2004 on the German label MTM and in Japan by Nippon Crown.

Seven years later, the sequel "Secret Love" was released in 2011 on the Songwork label. The album, recorded at Fenix recording studios  contains a classic Red Book CD and a disc with the far higher audio quality DVD-Audio, in surround mix format.

According to the band's official website  as of April 2012, Crossfade is currently working on new material.

References

External links
 Official website
 Göran Edman Homepage
 Fenix Recording Studios

Musical groups established in 1999
Crossover (music)
Rock music duos
Swedish rock music groups
1999 establishments in Sweden